Jennifer Michele Vasconcelos (born May 11, 1994) is an American professional soccer player who plays as a forward for Portland Thorns in the NWSL.

Club career
Vasconcelos played for Real Salt Lake Women in the United Women's Soccer league during the 2016 season.

Chicago Red Stars, 2018–2020
She was drafted by the Chicago Red Stars with the 11th pick in the 2017 NWSL College Draft. She missed the entire 2017 NWSL season as she was pregnant with her first child.

On March 25, 2018, Vasconcelos made her debut for Chicago Red Stars in a 1–1 draw against Houston Dash. She appeared in 20 games for the Red Stars in 2018.

In 2019 Vasconcelos appeared in 11 games and scored 2 goals before tearing her ACL in Week 12 against Sky Blue FC. She would miss the remainder of the 2019 season

Vasconcelos appeared in 6 matches for the Red Stars at the NWSL Challenge Cup.

Utah Royals FC, 2020
On September 10, 2020, Utah Royals FC acquired Vasconcelos from the Red Stars in exchange for $55,000 in allocation money.

Sevilla FC, 2021
On September 1, 2021, Kansas City loaned Vasconcelos to Sevilla FC for one season.

Portland Thorns, 2022
Vasconcelos was signed in July 2022 by the Portland Thorns as a national team replacement player. On July 29th, her contract was extended until the end of the 2022 season

International career
Vasconcelos received a call-up to the United States Under-23 Women's National Team for a training camp in November 2017.

Personal life
Vasconcelos is a member of the Church of Jesus Christ of Latter-day Saints. She married Pedro Vasconcelos in 2014. He was a member of the BYU Cougars men's soccer team. She gave birth to their daughter, Scarlett, in 2017.

References

External links

1994 births
Living people
National Women's Soccer League players
Chicago Red Stars players
BYU Cougars women's soccer players
American women's soccer players
Chicago Red Stars draft picks
Soccer players from Utah
People from Sandy, Utah
Women's association football forwards
Latter Day Saints from Utah
Kansas City Current players